Wilfred Edwards may refer to:
 Wilfred Edwards (VC) (1893–1972), English recipient of the Victoria Cross
 Wilfred Edwards (swimmer) (1889–1950), British swimmer
 Wilfred Norman Edwards (1890–1956), British geologist
 Wilf Edwards, English footballer